Hermann Heinrich Becker may refer to:
 Hermann Heinrich Becker (politician) (1820–1885), German politician
 Hermann Heinrich Becker (painter) (1817–1885), German painter, art historian and author